James H. McLean (born 16 September 1978) is an Australian professional golfer that spent 2003 on the PGA Tour.

Amateur career
As a freshman, McLean was the individual champion at the 1998 NCAA Division I Championship for the University of Minnesota and was an All-American in both 1998 and 1999.  Also in 1998, McLean won the Minnesota State Open and Minnesota State Amateur.

Professional career
McLean played seven events on the European Tour in 2001, where his best finish was T-10 at the Novotel Perrier Open de France.

McLean was a member of the Buy.com Tour in 2002 where he finished 84th on the money list. McLean then when to Q School where he earned his PGA Tour card.

McLean was a member of the PGA Tour in 2003 where he had 19 starts. That season he became ill and received a medical exemption that enabled him to enter various PGA Tour events from 2004 to 2006.

McLean played sparingly on the Japan Golf Tour in 2012 and 2013 with a best finish of T-10 at the 2012 Toshin Golf Tournament.

Personal life
His father, Graeme McLean, was a footballer who played in five games for St Kilda Football Club of the Australian Football League (then known as the Victorian Football League).

Amateur wins (3)
1997 Riversdale Cup
1998 Minnesota State Amateur, NCAA Division I Championship

Professional wins (1)
1998 Minnesota State Open (as an amateur)

See also
2002 PGA Tour Qualifying School graduates

References

External links

Australian male golfers
Minnesota Golden Gophers men's golfers
European Tour golfers
PGA Tour golfers
Japan Golf Tour golfers
Golfers from Sydney
Golfers from Melbourne
Golfers from Minneapolis
1978 births
Living people